Cycling was contested at the 2002 Asian Games in Busan, South Korea. Road bicycle racing was held at the Road Cycle Race Stadium from September 30 to October 2, while track cycling was contested at Geumjeong Velodrome from October 4 to October 8 and mountain biking was contested at Gijang Mountain Bike Race Stadium from October 10 to October 13.

Schedule

Medalists

Mountain bike

Men

Women

Road

Men

Women

Track

Men

Women

Medal table

Participating nations
A total of 181 athletes from 20 nations competed in cycling at the 2002 Asian Games:

References

2002 Asian Games Report, Pages 358–392

External links
 2002 Asian Games website

 
2002 Asian Games events
2002
Asian Games
2002 Asian Games
2002 in road cycling
2002 in track cycling
2002 in mountain biking